Friends Again were a Scottish new wave band, formed in 1981 in Glasgow, Scotland.

They were formed by members Chris Thomson (guitar, vocals) and Paul McGeechan (keyboards), together with Neil Cunningham (bass), James Grant (guitar, vocals) and Stuart Kerr (drums).  The group were famous for their singles "State of Art", "Sunkissed" and "Honey at the Core". They released a self-titled EP in 1984, which peaked at No. 59 on the UK Singles Chart. They then recorded their debut album, Trapped & Unwrapped (1984).

After the demise of the band, Grant went on to form Love and Money in 1985 along with McGeechan and Kerr, while Thomson formed the Bathers.

Discography

Albums
 Trapped and Unwrapped (1984)

Singles
 "Honey at the Core" (1983)
 "State of Art" (1983) - UK No. 93
 "Sunkissed" (1983)
 The Friends Again EP (1984) - UK No. 59
 "South of Love" (1984)

References

External links
 Friends Again online discography

Scottish new wave musical groups
Musical groups from Glasgow
Musical groups established in 1981
Musical groups disestablished in 1984
Mercury Records artists